Avner Friedman (born November 19, 1932) is Distinguished Professor of Mathematics and Physical Sciences at Ohio State University. His primary field of research is partial differential equations, with interests in stochastic processes, mathematical modeling, free boundary problems, and control theory.

Friedman received his Ph.D. degree in 1956 from the Hebrew University. He was a professor of mathematics at Northwestern University (1962–1985), a Duncan Distinguished Professor of Mathematics at Purdue University (1985–1987), and a professor of mathematics (Regents' Professor from 1996) at the University of Minnesota (1987–2001). He was director of the Institute for Mathematics and its Applications from 1987 to 1997.  He was the founding director of Minnesota Center for Industrial Mathematics (1994-2001). He was the founding Director of the Mathematical Biosciences Institute at Ohio State University, serving as its first director from 2002–2008.

Friedman has been the Chair of the Board of Mathematical Sciences (1994–1997) and the President of the Society for Industrial and Applied Mathematics (1993–1994). He has been awarded the Sloan Fellowship (1962–65), the Guggenheim Fellowship (1966–7), the Stampacchia Prize (1982), the National Science Foundation Special Creativity Award (1983–85; 1991–93). He is a Fellow of the American Academy of Arts and Sciences (since 1987) and a member of the National Academy of Sciences (since 1993). In 2009 he became a Fellow of the Society for Industrial and Applied Mathematics. In 2012 he became a fellow of the American Mathematical Society.

He has been adviser to 27 doctoral students and has published 25 books and over 500 papers.

Works
 Generalized Functions and Partial Differential Equations. Prentice-Hall (1963). Dover Publications 2005 ; 2011 Dover reprint 
 Partial Differential Equations of Parabolic Type. Prentice-Hall (1964). 2008 Dover Publications; 2013 Dover reprint 
 Partial Differential Equations. Holt, Rinehart, and Winston, New York (1969). reprint Dover Books 2008 
 Foundations of Modern Analysis. Holt, Rinehart, and Winston, New York (1970).  (hbk); 1982 Dover reprint; Dover Publications on Mathematics 2010. 
 Advanced Calculus. Holt, Rinehart, and Winston, New York (1971). Dover Publications 2007  
 Differential Games. John Wiley, Interscience Publishers (1971). Dover Publications 2006  2013 Dover reprint 
 Stochastic Differential Equations and Applications. Vol. 1, Academic Press (1975). Dover Books 2006. 
 Stochastic Differential Equations and Applications. Vol. 2, Academic Press (1976). 
 Variational Principles and Free Boundary Problems, Wiley & Sons (1983). Dover Publications on Mathematics 2010 ; 2012 pbk reprint, Springer
 Mathematics in Industrial Problems, IMA Volume 16, Springer-Verlag (1988).  
 Mathematics in Industrial Problems, Part 2, IMA Volume 24, Springer-Verlag (1989); 2012 pbk reprint
 Mathematics in Industrial Problems, Part 3, IMA Volume 31, Springer-Verlag (1990).   
 Mathematics in Industrial Problems, Part 4, IMA Volume 38, Springer-Verlag (1991). 2012 pbk reprint 
 Mathematics in Industrial Problems, Part 5, IMA Volume 49, Springer-Verlag (1992).  2012 pbk reprint 
 Mathematics in Industrial Problems, Part 6, IMA Volume 57, Springer-Verlag (1993).  
 (with W. Littman) Problems in Industrial Mathematics, SIAM, Philadelphia (1994). 
 Mathematics in Industrial Problems, Part 7, IMA Volume 67, Springer-Verlag (1994).  
 Mathematics in Industrial Problems, Part 8, IMA Volume 83, Springer-Verlag (1996).  
 Mathematics in Industrial Problems, Part 9, IMA Volume 88, Springer-Verlag (1997).
 Mathematics in Industrial Problems, Part 10, IMA Volume 100, Springer-Verlag (1998).  
 (with D. Ross) Mathematical Models in Photographic Science, Springer-Verlag (2002).   
 (with B. Aguda) Models of Cellular Regulation, Oxford University Press, 2008. 
 (with Chiu-Yen Kao). Mathematical Modeling with Biological Processes. Springer. 2014 
 (with Ching-Shan Chou) Introduction to Mathematical Biology: Modeling, Analysis, and Simulations. Springer-Verlag 2016 
 Mathematical Biology: Modeling and Analysis. American Mathematical Society. 2018

References

External links 
 Avner Friedman's Web Page
 Avner Friedman Short Curriculum Vitae

20th-century American mathematicians
21st-century American mathematicians
PDE theorists
Members of the United States National Academy of Sciences
Ohio State University faculty
Fellows of the American Academy of Arts and Sciences
Fellows of the Society for Industrial and Applied Mathematics
Fellows of the American Mathematical Society
American expatriates in Israel
20th-century American Jews
Living people
1932 births
Presidents of the Society for Industrial and Applied Mathematics
21st-century American Jews